Three ships of the Royal Navy have borne the name HMS Glowworm after the insect, whilst two more were planned:

 Glowworm, was briefly the name of a coastal destroyer launched on 12 December 1906 and renamed . It was sold in May 1921.
 Glowworm was allocated to a  destroyer under construction at the William Denny shipyard at Dumbarton in 1945.  The vessel was originally called  HMS Guinevere but was renamed in September 1945 to HMS Glowworm, and renamed again in October to HMS Gift. Construction was cancelled on 1 December 1945 before completion.
 Glowworm was allocated in October 1945 to a similar  destroyer under construction by John I. Thornycroft & Company Limited, and originally called  HMS Gift. Construction was cancelled on 12 December 1945 before completion.

Battle honours
Ships named Glowworm have earned the following battle honours:
Atlantic, 1939
Norway, 1940
Admiral Hipper, 1940

References
 

Royal Navy ship names